
The year 509 BC was a year of the pre-Julian Roman calendar. In the Roman Republic it was known as the Year of the Consulship of Brutus and Collatinus (or, less frequently, year 245  Ab urbe condita). The denomination 509 BC for this year has been used since the early medieval period, when the Anno Domini calendar era became the prevalent method in Europe for naming years.

Events

By place

Roman Republic 
According to the traditional account:

 The Roman monarchy is overthrown, and the Republican period begins (traditional date).
 The first pair of Roman consuls are elected.
 The Tarquinian conspiracy is formed yet discovered, and the conspirators are executed.
 Forces of Veii and Tarquinii, led by the deposed king Lucius Tarquinius Superbus, are defeated in the Battle of Silva Arsia by the Roman army. Consul Publius Valerius Publicola celebrates the first republican triumph on March 1. 
 September 13—The Temple of Jupiter Optimus Maximus on Rome's Capitoline Hill is dedicated on the ides of September.
 Carthage signs a treaty with Rome, delineating their respective spheres.

Deaths
 Lucius Junius Brutus, Roman consul and founder of the Roman republic (traditional date)
 Titus Junius Brutus and Tiberius Junius Brutus, brothers (and sons of the consul Lucius Junius Brutus) together with their two uncles the Vitellii and three brothers Aquillii, all executed following the discovery of the Tarquinian conspiracy
 Aruns, son of the last Roman king Lucius Tarquinius Superbus
 Spurius Lucretius Tricipitinus, Roman consul suffectus

References